is a railway station in Chitose, Hokkaido, Japan, operated by Hokkaido Railway Company (JR Hokkaido).

Lines
Minami-Chitose Station is served by the Chitose Line and Sekishō Line. The station is numbered "H14".

Limited express trains
 Ōzora ( - )
 Tokachi (Sapporo - )
 Hokuto ( - )
 Suzuran (Sapporo - )

Station layout

The station consists of two island platforms serving four tracks, with the station situated above the tracks. The station has automated ticket machines, automated turnstiles which accept Kitaca, and a "Midori no Madoguchi" staffed ticket office.

Platforms

Adjacent stations

References

Minami-Chitose Station
Railway stations in Japan opened in 1980
Chitose, Hokkaido